Grant Avenue station may refer to:
 Grant Avenue (IND Fulton Street Line)
 Grant Avenue (BMT Fulton Street Line)